The Løkkeås Tunnel is a road tunnel that runs under Løkkeåsen in Sandvika, Norway. It is a part of a Norwegian National Road 164 spur running from Engervannet north to join the main road. It is approximately 190 metres long.

References

Proposed tunnels in Norway
Road tunnels in Viken
Tunnels in Bærum